Apasionadamente (English language:Passionately) is a 1944 Argentine romantic comedy film directed by Luis César Amadori and written by Enrique Vico Carré.

Cast
 Enrique Chaico
 Ada Cornaro
 Rafael Frontaura
 Pedro López Lagar
 José Maurer
 Zully Moreno
 Juan José Piñeiro

External links
 

1944 films
1940s Spanish-language films
Argentine black-and-white films
Films directed by Luis César Amadori
1944 romantic comedy films
Argentine romantic comedy films
1940s Argentine films